Southern Pacific 3100 is a GE U25B diesel-electric locomotive now on permanent exhibit at the Southern California Railway Museum, formerly the Orange Empire Railway Museum in Perris, California, US. It is notable as being the only U25B still in operating condition.

Construction and service 
Built in 1963 by General Electric under construction number 34700, it was shipped from GE's Erie, Pennsylvania, locomotive assembly plant to the Southern Pacific Railroad on March 29, 1963. It entered service in April and was assigned to the Los Angeles Freight Pool with Taylor Yard Roundhouse as its maintenance point.

The locomotive was first numbered SP 7508, then renumbered SP 6708 during the railroad's 1965 general renumbering. After a period of storage in the early 1970s, the U25B was moved to the Sacramento General Shops in 1975 for a complete rebuilding, one of only two U25Bs so done.  The work included upgrading the prime mover with later GE U33C-compatible parts, a complete rewiring of the high- and low-voltage electrical systems, the installation of an AAR control stand and a new number - SP 6800. It was released from Sacramento on September 29 and returned to service.

The U25B became a "goodwill ambassador" for the railroad in 1976 when it was painted in an elaborate red, white, and blue color scheme in celebration of the nation's bicentennial, one of four Southern Pacific locomotives so painted. The others were GS-4 4449, EMD GP40P-2 3197, and EMD SD45T-2 9389. After the bicentennial celebration, it was repainted in the standard red and gray SP color scheme. In late 1977, 6800 was assigned to local and hauler service in the Los Angeles Basin, primarily working out of Taylor Yard in Los Angeles and West Colton Yard. In June 1979, it received its final renumbering as SP 3100. In and out of storage for the rest of its time with the railroad, 3100 was finally retired on December 17, 1986, and sold serviceable to Levin Metals in Colton on January 22, 1988.

Preservation 
On February 2, 1988, 3100 was donated in operable condition to the Orange Empire Railway Museum. It was used for excursion passenger service regularly in the museum and even onto old ATSF trackage for longer excursions (now repurposed by SCAX)The locomotive was repainted and restored in between mid-2009 and 2010. It is still operating today on daily trains.

References 

 

3100
General Electric locomotives
B-B locomotives
Diesel-electric locomotives of the United States
Preserved diesel locomotives
Railway locomotives introduced in 1963
Landmarks of Riverside County, California
Perris, California
Standard gauge locomotives of the United States
Individual locomotives of the United States